Thomas "Tom" Bugg was a professional rugby league footballer who played in the 1920s. He played at club level for the Featherstone Rovers (Heritage № 56).

Club career
Thomas Bugg made his début for the Featherstone Rovers on Saturday 13 September 1924.

References

External links
Search for "Bugg" at rugbyleagueproject.org

English rugby league players
Featherstone Rovers players
Place of birth missing
Place of death missing
Year of birth missing
Year of death missing